Béryl Gastaldello (born 16 February 1995) is a French swimmer.

Gastaldello is a third-generation Olympic athlete representing France. She is a member of the LA Current Club Team of the International Swim League (ISL). Gastaldello trains at the Texas A&M University facilities in College Station, TX. She is represented by ELIS Athletics, an international sports management and marketing agency.

Béryl is originally from Marseille, France but moved to Texas as an international recruit for Texas A&M. She started swimming at the age of 8 and began serious training when she reached 16. Her specialization is mostly butterfly and freestyle, but it didn’t stop her from breaking the French national record in the 50m backstroke back in 2015. The European Championships held in Glasgow in 2018 was the first major international event where she reserved gold. Her hobbies are skateboarding and playing percussion.

She competed at the 2015 World Aquatics Championships and at the 2016 Summer Olympics in Rio de Janeiro.

References

External links
Béryl Gastaldello at SwimSwam.com

1995 births
Living people
French female backstroke swimmers
French female butterfly swimmers
French female freestyle swimmers
Swimmers from Marseille
French expatriate sportspeople in the United States
Olympic swimmers of France
Swimmers at the 2016 Summer Olympics
Swimmers at the 2020 Summer Olympics
Mediterranean Games gold medalists for France
Mediterranean Games medalists in swimming
Swimmers at the 2013 Mediterranean Games
European Aquatics Championships medalists in swimming
World Aquatics Championships medalists in swimming
Medalists at the FINA World Swimming Championships (25 m)
Texas A&M Aggies women's swimmers